Mata Hari (1876–1917) was a Dutch exotic dancer executed for espionage during World War I.

Mata Hari or  Matahari may also refer to:

Film and television
 Mata Hari (1927 film), a German film starring Magda Sonja
 Mata Hari (1931 film), starring Greta Garbo in the title role
 Mata Hari (1985 film), produced by Golan-Globus
 Mata Hari (unfinished film), a project begun in the 1970s by David Carradine
 Mata Hari, Agent H21, a 1964 French-Italian spy film
 Mata Hari (TV series), a 2017 program jointly produced by Ukrainian Star Media company and Channel One Russia

Music and musicals
 Mata Hari (musical), a 1967 musical by Jerome Coopersmith, Martin Charnin and Edward Thomas
 Mata Hari (Wildhorn musical), a 2016 musical by Frank Wildhorn, Jack Murphy and Ivan Mechell
 "Mata Hari" (Ofra Haza song), 1995 song by Israeli singer Ofra Haza
 "Mata Hari" (Anne-Karine Strøm song), the Norwegian entry in the Eurovision Song Contest 1976
 "Mata Hari" (Samira Efendi song), the Azerbaijani entry in the Eurovision Song Contest 2021

Businesses
 Matahari Books, a Malaysian publishing company
 Matahari (department store), a major department store chain in Indonesia

Other uses
 Mata Hari (horse), an American Thoroughbred racehorse
 Mata Hari (pinball), a 1977 pinball machine
 Mata Hari (video game), a 2008 adventure game for Windows